In the study of zero sum games, Glicksberg's theorem (also Glicksberg's existence theorem) is a result that shows certain games have a minimax value
.

where f and g run over Borel probability measures on A and B.

The theorem is useful if f and g are interpreted as mixed strategies of two players in the context of a continuous game.  If the payoff function K is upper semicontinuous, then the game has a value.

The continuity condition may not be dropped: see example of a game with no value.

References 

Game theory